Michael Floyd (born 26 September 1976) is an English hammer thrower. At the 2010 Commonwealth Games in Delhi he won a bronze medal.

Nationally, he ranked second at the AAA Championships in 2003 and 2006, as well as having third placed finishes in 2002 and 2004. Floyd won his first national title at the British Athletics Championships in 2008. He was runner-up at the British Athletics Championships in 2007, 2010 and 2011, and third at the 2009 championships.

He was the Division B winner at the European Champion Clubs Cup in 2008, and placed seventh at the international 2008 European Cup that same year.

International competitions

See also
List of Commonwealth Games medallists in athletics (men)

References

External links
 

1976 births
Living people
British male hammer throwers
English male hammer throwers
Commonwealth Games medallists in athletics
Commonwealth Games bronze medallists for England
Athletes (track and field) at the 2010 Commonwealth Games
British Athletics Championships winners
Medallists at the 2010 Commonwealth Games